Daniela Ludwig (née Raab, born 7 July 1975) is a German politician of the Christian Social Union (CSU) who has been serving as a member of the  since 2002.

Early life and education 
Ludwig studied law at Ludwig Maximilian University of Munich until 2002.

Political career 
Ludwig joined the Christian Social Union in Bavaria (CSU) at the age of 18. Since 2005 she has represented the electoral district of Rosenheim. She also sits on the district council of the  Rosenheim. Ludwig was deputy general secretary of the CSU in 2018–19. She was the spokesperson on transport policy for the CDU/CSU group.

In the negotiations to form a Grand Coalition of Chancellor Angela Merkel's Christian Democrats (CDU together with the Bavarian CSU) and the SPD following the 2013 federal elections, Ludwig was part of the CDU/CSU delegation in the working group on families, women and equality, led by Annette Widmann-Mauz and Manuela Schwesig. In similar negotiations following the 2017 federal elections, she was part of the working group on transport and infrastructure, led by Michael Kretschmer, Alexander Dobrindt and Sören Bartol.

From 2019 until 2021, Ludwig served as Commissioner on Narcotic Drugs at the Federal Ministry of Health in the government of Chancellor Merkel, succeeding Marlene Mortler. Her appointment was criticised by opposition politicians and activists due to her lack of experience on drug policy. Later that year Ludwig sparked a debate on legalising cannabis, and stated that she wanted to find a compromise on liberalising the prohibition for personal recreational use. She also called for a comprehensive ban on advertisements for smoking, including e-cigarettes.

Since 2022, Ludwig has been serving as chairwoman of the chairman of the Committee on the Scrutiny of Elections, Immunity and the Rules of Procedure. She is also a member of the Committee on Education, Research and Technology Assessment.

Political positions
In June 2017, Ludwig voted against Germany's introduction of same-sex marriage.

Recognition 
In 2019 Ludwig received the Order of Merit of the Federal Republic of Germany (Cross of Merit) for charitable engagement.

Personal life 
Ludwig married Florian Ludwig, teacher and city councillor, in 2010. They became parents of twins in 2011.

References

External links 
  
 
 
 

1975 births
Living people
Ludwig Maximilian University of Munich alumni
Members of the Bundestag for Bavaria
Female members of the Bundestag
Recipients of the Cross of the Order of Merit of the Federal Republic of Germany
Members of the Bundestag 2021–2025
Members of the Bundestag 2017–2021
Members of the Bundestag 2013–2017
Members of the Bundestag 2009–2013
Members of the Bundestag 2005–2009
Members of the Bundestag 2002–2005
Politicians from Munich
Members of the Bundestag for the Christian Social Union in Bavaria
21st-century German women politicians